Mohamed Zayar (born 11 March 1964) is a Syrian wrestler. He competed in the men's freestyle 74 kg at the 1984 Summer Olympics.

References

1964 births
Living people
Syrian male sport wrestlers
Olympic wrestlers of Syria
Wrestlers at the 1984 Summer Olympics
Wrestlers at the 1988 Summer Olympics
Place of birth missing (living people)
Asian Games medalists in wrestling
Wrestlers at the 1990 Asian Games
Wrestlers at the 1994 Asian Games
Asian Games bronze medalists for Syria
Medalists at the 1990 Asian Games
20th-century Syrian people